The Federal Agency for Forestry (Rosleskhoz) is a federal body that exercises oversight over forestry use in the Russian Federation. It was formed on 2004 as part of Russia's Ministry of Natural Resources and Environment.

References

External links 
 Official website  

2004 establishments in Russia
Government agencies established in 2004
Government agencies of Russia